The Warm Springs Avenue Historic District in Boise, Idaho, is a residential area with 96 contributing houses representing a variety of architectural styles constructed between 1870 and 1940. The district includes Queen Anne, Colonial Revival, Tudor Revival, Bungalow, and other styles representing the work of architects Tourtellotte & Hummel, Wayland & Fennell, Kirtland Cutter, and others. The Children's Home Society of Idaho occupies the largest structure in the district, and its buildings are the only structures that are not houses.

In 1892 Christopher W. Moore built the first large house on Warm Springs Avenue. Moore owned the Boise Artesian Hot and Cold Water Company, and his house was the first residence in the United States to be heated by geothermal means. Other prominent Boise residents built homes on the avenue, and many depended on Moore's water company for heat.

The district was added to the National Register of Historic Places in 1980, and it was designated a local historic district by the City of Boise in 1996.

List of contributing properties
This list of contributing resources includes the site name, year, address, architect, and style where information is available. Additional information and references are included for some properties.

South side of East Warm Springs Avenue

 Edwin Davis House (1910), 511 E Warm Springs Ave, Colonial Revival
 Davis Estate Rental House (1910), 525 E Warm Springs Ave, Colonial Revival
 Clement Moore House (1912), 531 E Warm Springs Ave, Colonial Revival
 John D. Springer House (1897), 605 E Warm Springs Ave, Queen Anne
 Robert Fraser House (1894), 615 E Warm Springs Ave, Queen Anne
 Lee Estes House (1903), 635 E Warm Springs Ave, Tourtellotte & Co., Queen Anne
 Estes Carriage House (1903),  E Warm Springs Ave
 Benjamin and Emilie Wilson House (1895), 709 E Warm Springs Ave, Colonial Revival, Queen Anne
 Wilson Rental House (1896), 715 E Warm Springs Ave
 Wilson Rental House (1898), 739 E Warm Springs Ave
 Wilson Rental House (1898), 741 E Warm Springs Ave
 White Rental House (1900), 805 E Warm Springs Ave
 White Rental House (1901), 807 E Warm Springs Ave
 John White House (1900, 1923), 809,  E Warm Springs Ave
 F.H. Brandt House (1916), 815 E Warm Springs Ave, Prairie Style
 Craig Coffin House (1919), 829 E Warm Springs Ave, Wayland & Fennell, Colonial Revival
 Walter Cranston House (1935), 905 E Warm Springs Ave, Colonial Revival
 Jack Skillern House (1909), 915 E Warm Springs Ave, Wayland & Fennell, Bungalow
 C.C. Anderson House (1925), 929 E Warm Springs Ave, Kirtland Cutter, Jacobean Revival
 Charles O. Davidson House (1916), 945 E Warm Springs Ave, Wayland & Fennell, Colonial Revival
 William Regan House (1911), 1009 E Warm Springs Ave, Tourtellotte & Hummel, Mission Revival
 George Russell House (1869), 1035 E Warm Springs Ave, Colonial Revival
 J.E. Clinton House (1906), 1037 E Warm Springs Ave, Wayland & Fennell, Colonial Revival
 Moore-Cunningham House (1892), 1109 E Warm Springs Ave, James King, Queen Anne
 Frank H. Parsons House (1925), 1127 E Warm Springs Ave, Wayland & Fennell, Tudor Revival
 Roger M. Davidson House (1901), 1205 E Warm Springs Ave, W.S. Campbell, Colonial Revival
 Julius Steinmeier House (1907), 1215 E Warm Springs Ave (moved from First and Idaho Sts), John Smith, Colonial Revival
 S.B. Kingsbury House (1897), 1225 E Warm Springs Ave, James King, Queen Anne
 Joseph Dollard House (1938), 1305 E Warm Springs Ave, Colonial Revival
 J.B. Lyon House (1899), 1311 E Warm Springs Ave, Queen Anne, Colonial Revival
 Thomas Finnegan House (1901), 1321 E Warm Springs Ave, Queen Anne
 (1905, 1920), 1403 E Warm Springs Ave, Bungalow
 Jesse Jackson House (1906), 1415 E Warm Springs Ave, Colonial Revival
 John K. Enboe House (1903), 1419 E Warm Springs Ave, Campbell & Wayland, Queen Anne
 Thomas K. Little House (1922), 1433 E Warm Springs Ave, Colonial Revival
 Eugene Brasie House (1920), 1503 E Warm Springs Ave, Colonial Revival
 Connor House (1919), 1505 E Warm Springs Ave, Bungalow
 1525 E Warm Springs Ave, Colonial Revival
 Robert Davidson House (1920), 1609 E Warm Springs Ave, Colonial Revival
 Charles Rathbun House (1919), 1615 E Warm Springs Ave, Wayland & Fennell, Colonial Revival
 C.H. Nixon House (1922), 1621 E Warm Springs Ave, Bungalow
 John W. Maynard House (1879), 1703 E Warm Springs Ave
 (1930s), 1707 E Warm Springs Ave, Colonial Revival

North side of East Warm Springs Avenue

 510 E Warm Springs Ave, Queen Anne
 514 E Warm Springs Ave
 520 E Warm Springs Ave, Bungalow
 530 E Warm Springs Ave, Bungalow
 600 E Warm Springs Ave, Colonial Revival
 604 E Warm Springs Ave, Colonial Revival
 Children's Home Society of Idaho (1910, 1934), 740 E Warm Springs Ave, Tourtellotte & Hummel, Colonial Revival
 (1898), 836 E Warm Springs Ave
 Lola Shaw House (1917), 838 E Warm Springs Ave, Bungalow
 (1898), 840 E Warm Springs Ave
 (1922), 848 E Warm Springs Ave, Bungalow
 Joseph Kinney House (1904), 904 E Warm Springs Ave, Tourtellotte & Co., Queen Anne
 John S. Parker House (1910), 910 E Warm Springs Ave, Colonial Revival
 Risley House, 912 E Warm Springs Ave, Colonial Revival
 Carl J. Hill House (1913), 916 E Warm Springs Ave, Wayland & Fennell, Colonial Revival
 W.M. Davidson House (1905), 920 E Warm Springs Ave, Tourtellotte & Co., Colonial Revival, Bungalow
 Benjamin F. Howe (1913), 1002 E Warm Springs Ave, Colonial Revival
 Roger C. Davidson House (1938), 1010 E Warm Springs Ave, Colonial Revival
 J.E. Moore House (1912), 1016 E Warm Springs Ave, Colonial Revival
 B.W. Walker House (1909), 1104 E Warm Springs Ave, Wayland & Fennell, Colonial Revival
 W.A. Goulder House (1890), 1110 E Warm Springs Ave
 C.V. Parks House (1939), 1120 E Warm Springs Ave, Tudor Revival
 I.B. Fitchen House (1895), 1204 E Warm Springs Ave, Queen Anne
 Charles C. Cavanah House (1925), 1302 E Warm Springs Ave, Charles Hummel, Colonial Revival
 Lindley Cox House, 1308 E Warm Springs Ave, Tourtellotte & Co., Colonial Revival
 F.F. Johnson House (1910), 1312 E Warm Springs Ave, Wayland & Fennell, Colonial Revival
 Leo Falk House (1922), 1320 E Warm Springs Ave, Kirtland Cutter, Mission Revival
 J.S. Springer House (1922), 1414 E Warm Springs Ave, Tudor Revival
 Alfred Budge House (1927), 1418 E Warm Springs Ave, Colonial Revival
 Jacob Wagner House (1894), 1420 E Warm Springs Ave, Queen Anne
 A.H. Budge House (1931), 1424 E Warm Springs Ave, Colonial Revival
 Edward Payne House (1899), 1504 E Warm Springs Ave, John E. Tourtellotte, Colonial Revival
 Francis Stone House (1930), 1510 E Warm Springs Ave, Tudor Revival
 Uriah Seaman House (1899), 1514 E Warm Springs Ave
 Richard B. Kading House (1922), 1516 E Warm Springs Ave, Bungalow
 Leo Falk House (1925), 1522 E Warm Springs Ave, Mediterranean Revival

Houses on streets parallel or intersecting with Warm Springs Avenue
 Clinton Carriage House (1920), 119 S Walnut St
 Eastman Carriage House, behind 1215 E Warm Springs Ave, visible from E Lewis St
 A.A. Fraser House (1920), 117 N Walnut St, Mediterranean Revival
 C.G. Barton House (1920), 118 N Walnut St, Colonial Revival
 William Northrup House (1910), 203 N Walnut St, Colonial Revival, Bungalow
 Margaret Davidson House (1925), 117 N Locust St, Mission Revival
 John D Springer House (1911), 120 N Locust St, Stick Style
 Louis Feldman House (1911), 909 E Bannock St, Colonial Revival, Queen Anne

See also
 West Warm Springs Historic District

References

External links
 
 Charles Hummel, Warm Springs/East End Buildings, Idaho Architecture Project

		
National Register of Historic Places in Ada County, Idaho
Queen Anne architecture in Idaho
Colonial Revival architecture in Idaho